(KOF 2002, or KOF '02) is a fighting game produced by Eolith and Playmore for the Neo Geo in 2002. It is the ninth game in The King of Fighters series and the second one to be produced by Eolith and developed by Playmore (formerly Brezzasoft). The game was ported to the Dreamcast, PlayStation 2, and the Xbox, where in the PS2 and Xbox versions were released in North America in a two-in-one bundle with the following game in the series, The King of Fighters 2003. The Dreamcast port was released only in Japan, it was also the last game in the series to be officially released for the Japanese Dreamcast.

SNK Playmore produced a remake titled The King of Fighters 2002 Unlimited Match (KOF 2002UM) for the PlayStation 2, which was released on February 26, 2009, in Japan only, the last in the series for the Japanese PlayStation 2, and the game later received its first worldwide release on Xbox Live Arcade on November 3, 2010. A port of the Xbox Live Arcade release was later released on Steam on February 27, 2015.

Gameplay

The King of Fighters 2002 discards the 4-on-4 "Striker Match" format used in the previous three games in the series and returns to the 3-on-3 Battle format originally used in the series up until KOF '98.

The game also revamps the Power Gauge system into a format similar to the one used in The King of Fighters '97. Like the previous games in the series, the Power Gauge is filled as the player attacks the opponent or performs Special Moves during a battle. The number of Power Gauges the player can stock up is increased by one with each member of the team. For example, the first member of the team can stock up to three Power Gauges, while the third member can stock up to five. A single Power Gauge stock can be used to either perform a Counterattack and Evasion technique while guarding an opponent's attack, use a Super Special Move, or initiate the MAX Activation state. The same case also applies to the 1-on-1 format, where the Power Gauge the player can stock up is also increased by one with each round loss. For example, on the first round, the player can stock up to three Power Gauges, while losing two rounds allows the player to stock up to five.

During MAX Activation, the player's offensive and defensive strength is increased for a short period and can cancel any attack into another player. In this state, a Super Special Move can be used without consuming a Power Gauge stock. There are also MAX Super Special Moves, which are Super moves that can only be performed during MAX Activation with one Power Gauge stock, and MAX2 moves that require two stocks while low on health.

Characters

Just like The King of Fighters '98, the game has no storyline since the NESTS story arc has already concluded in the previous game, The King of Fighters 2001. Instead, a "Dream Match" is included featuring characters from all the previous games in the series. In addition to the recurring teams from the series, including the original Japan Team, the game also features a series of teams representing each of the previous game series from The King of Fighters '96 to The King of Fighters 2001. Omega Rugal returns as the final boss as well. However, not all the characters from the previous games are featured, and series' regulars such as King and Shingo Yabuki are absent from the Neo Geo version for the first time since their first appearance. The Dreamcast version of the game, nevertheless, features King and Shingo, while three additional characters from SVC Chaos: SNK vs. Capcom, namely Geese Howard, Goenitz, and Orochi Iori, are included in the PlayStation 2 and Xbox versions. Several characters have been redrawn, most notably the Orochi Team, representing The King of Fighters '98.

Japan Team
 Kyo Kusanagi
 Benimaru Nikaido
 Goro Daimon

Fatal Fury Team
 Terry Bogard
 Andy Bogard
 Joe Higashi

Art of Fighting Team
 Ryo Sakazaki
 Robert Garcia
 Takuma Sakazaki

Ikari Team
 Leona Heidern
 Ralf Jones
 Clark Still

Psycho Soldier Team
 Athena Asamiya
 Sie Kensou
 Chin Gentsai

Women Fighters Team
 Mai Shiranui
 Yuri Sakazaki
 May Lee

Korea Team
 Kim Kaphwan
 Chang Koehan
 Choi Bounge

Yagami Team
 Iori Yagami
 Mature
 Vice
Outlaw Team ('97 Special Team)
 Ryuji Yamazaki
 Blue Mary
 Billy Kane

Orochi Team / Awakened Orochi Team
 Yashiro Nanakase / Orochi Yashiro
 Shermie / Orochi Shermie
 Chris / Orochi Chris

K' Team
 K′
 Maxima
 Whip

Agent Team
 Vanessa
 Seth
 Ramón

NESTS Team
 Kula Diamond
 K9999
 Ángel

Boss
 Omega Rugal

Alternate
 Kusanagi

Console exclusives
 Shingo Yabuki (Dreamcast, PS2, Xbox versions)
 King (Dreamcast, PS2, Xbox versions)
 Geese Howard (PS2, Xbox versions)
 Goenitz (PS2, Xbox versions)
 Orochi Iori (PS2, Xbox versions)

Unlimited Match
A remake of KOF 2002, The King of Fighters 2002: Unlimited Match (KOF 2002UM) was released on February 26, 2009 for the PlayStation 2 in Japan and on November 3, 2010 for Xbox Live Arcade. The PlayStation 2 version also includes a port of the original The King of Fighters 2002 Neo Geo version. The game was later ported to Steam on February 27, 2015, and PlayStation 4 on February 8, 2021. A physical release was set for late Spring 2021. This remake features new characters, stages, music and artwork, as well as system and roster rebalancing.

Unlimited Match has 66 characters in total, making it the series' largest roster to date. There are 44 characters from The King of Fighters 2002, 16 characters from the NESTS arc, including King and Shingo, and 6 hidden characters, including additional characters from the previous console versions with the exception of Orochi Iori and particularly K9999, which is a character conceived as a pastiche of Tetsuo Shima from the manga Akira. Instead, a new character called  was designed to take his place in the game and features most of K9999's special techniques with altered effects.

In November 2020, the Steam version of the game was updated with rollback netcode, allowing for higher quality online play. The PlayStation 4 version was released with this same rollback netcode. In January 2022, the PC version was patched with spectating lobbies and additional improvements.

Unlimited Match Exclusives
 Nameless
 Foxy
 Hinako Shijo
 Lin
 Jhun Hoon
 Li Xiangfei
 Bao
 Kyo-1
 Kyo-2
 Kasumi Todoh
 Heidern

New and Re-Arranged Teams
Art of Fighting Team
 Ryo Sakazaki
 Robert Garcia
 Yuri Sakazaki

Psycho Soldier Team
 Athena Asamiya
 Sie Kensou
 Bao

Women Fighters Team
 King
 Mai Shiranui
 Kasumi Todoh

Masters Team
 Heidern
 Takuma Sakazaki
 Chin Gentsai

Bosses
 Krizalid
 Cloned Zero
 Original Zero
 Igniz
<div style="float:right; width:48%;">

NESTS Team
 Kula Diamond
 Ángel
 Foxy

East Asian Triple Alliance Team
 Jhun Hoon
 Shingo Yabuki
 Lin

Pretty Girl Fighters Team
 May Lee Jinju
 Hinako Shijo
 Li Xiangfei

Cloned Kyo Team
 Kusanagi
 Kyo-1
 Kyo-2

Exclusive Secret Characters
 Sie Kensou (99 - 2000 "Psychic Powerless" version)
 Takuma Sakazaki ('''99 - 2001 "Classic" version)
 Robert Garcia (99 - 2000 "Charge" version)
 Nightmare Geese
</div>

Reception and legacy
During its release week, the game sold 19,000 copies in Japan. In Issue 114 from Arcadia, the game was featured at ninth in its Top Ten Video Games'' list. Critical reception to the game was positive due to its large number of playable characters, although mixed opinions were given to its aging graphics. In addition, despite lacking a plot, the large interaction between characters was praised for adding depth to the game. The game has generally been considered one of the most popular games in the franchise in Latin America.

Notes

References

External links 
Official The King of Fighters 2002 Unlimited Match website
Official The King of Fighters 2002 website 

2002 video games
2D fighting games
ACA Neo Geo games
Arcade video games
Dreamcast games
Fighting games
Fighting games used at the Super Battle Opera tournament
Linux games
MacOS games
Multiplayer and single-player video games
Neo Geo games
NESiCAxLive games
Nintendo Switch games
PlayStation 2 games
PlayStation 4 games
PlayStation Network games
SNK Playmore games
The King of Fighters games
Video games developed in South Korea
Video games scored by Masahiko Hataya
Video games set in Cambodia
Video games set in China
Video games set in Greece
Video games set in Italy
Video games set in Japan
Video games set in Mexico
Video games set in South Korea
Video games set in Taiwan
Video games set in the Netherlands
Video games set in the United States
Video games with AI-versus-AI modes
Windows games
Xbox games
Xbox 360 Live Arcade games
Xbox One games
UTV Ignition Games games
Hamster Corporation games